Arushi or Aarushi may refer to:
 Arushi, wife of the legendary sage Chyavana
 Aarushi Sharma (active from 2015), Indian actress and beauty queen
 Aarushi Talwar (1994–2008), victim in the 2008 Noida double murder case

 

Indian feminine given names